(They will put you under banishment), is a church cantata by Johann Sebastian Bach. He composed it in Leipzig for Exaudi, the Sunday after Ascension, and first performed it on 13 May 1725.  The work includes some unusual woodwind scoring, two oboes da caccia and two oboes d'amore.

History and words 
Bach wrote the cantata in his second year in Leipzig for the Sunday Exaudi, the Sunday after Ascension. The prescribed readings for the feast day were from the First Epistle of Peter, "serve each other", and from the second Farewell discourse in the Gospel of John, the promise of the Paraclete, the "Spirit of Truth", and the announcement of prosecution.

Some of the cantatas composed by Bach in his second year were chorale cantatas, a format he chose for services between the first Sunday after Trinity and Palm Sunday. For Easter he had returned to cantatas on more varied texts. Nine of the cantatas for the period between Easter and Pentecost are based on texts of Christiana Mariana von Ziegler, including this cantata. Bach later assigned it to his third annual cycle. "They will put you under banishment, but the time will come, when, whoever kills you will think that he does God a service by it". She continues stressing the lack of fear possible for a follower who relies on "" (the protective arm of Jesus). In movements 3 and 4 she refers to the beginning of the gospel, the spirit who will assist. The closing chorale is the fifth stanza of Paul Gerhardt's "".

Bach first performed the cantata on 13 May 1725.

Publication 
The autograph score was inherited by C.P.E. Bach.
The music was not published until 1891 when it appeared as part of the first complete edition of the composer´s work, the Bach-Gesellschaft-Ausgabe.  The editor of the volume in question was Alfred Dörffel.

Ziegler published the text in a collection of her work, along with the other ones set by Bach. These printed versions are slightly different from the texts used in the cantatas, and this is believed to be the result of the composer modifying the libretti with which he was presented.

Structure and scoring 
Bach structured the cantata in five movements, beginning with what John Eliot Gardiner describes as a "curtain raiser", a line from the gospel set as a recitative. This is followed by a sequence aria–recitative–aria, and the cantata is concluded by a four-part chorale. Bach scored the work for four vocal soloists (soprano, alto, tenor and bass), a four-part choir only in the closing chorale, and a Baroque instrumental ensemble in an unusual combination of instruments, two oboes d'amore (Oa), two oboes da caccia (Oc), two violins (Vl), viola (Va), a violoncello piccolo (Vp) and basso continuo.

In the following table of the movements, the scoring follows the Neue Bach-Ausgabe. The continuo, playing throughout, is not shown.

Music 

A year earlier (in Sie werden euch in den Bann tun, BWV 44), Bach rendered the announcement of Jesus in a two-part movement, a duet for bass and tenor followed by an agitated chorus. In this cantata, he sets it as a recitative of only five measures. The instrumentation is novel, having long chords of the four oboes, two oboes da caccia and two oboes d'amore, accompany the voice above a pedal point held by the continuo. This creates a "sepulchral" sound. The Bach scholar Christoph Wolff notes that this "opulent oboe scoring" with all four oboes playing together is used only in the two recitatives (1 and 3).

The second movement, the first aria, is the longest of the work. It is sung by the tenor with an obbligato part for violoncello piccolo, an instrument with a tenor-bass range. The "dark and shaded" timbre of the movement has been seen as representing the protection provided by Christ. Denying the fear of the threatening death, the violoncello piccolo plays continuous runs.

Movement 3 is again a recitativo accompagnato, even more complex than the first one; the strings play long chords, whereas all the oboes repeat the same four-note motif throughout the movement, sung by the alto on the words "Ich bin bereit" (I am ready).

The second aria is accompanied by the strings and the two oboes da caccia in unison as obbligato instruments, thus both arias are dominated by instruments with a relatively low range (oboes de caccia having a pitch below that of a normal oboe).

The cantata is closed by a four-part chorale on the tune of "".

Recordings 
The selection is taken from the listing on the Bach Cantatas Website. Choirs with one voice per part (OVPP) and orchestras playing period instruments in historically informed performances are marked green.

Notes

References

Sources 
 
 Sie werden euch in den Bann tun BWV 183; BC A 79 / Sacred cantata (7th Sunday of Easter) Bach Digital
 BWV 183 Sie werden euch in den Bann tun English translation, University of Vermont
 
 Luke Dahn: BWV 183.5 bach-chorales.com

Church cantatas by Johann Sebastian Bach
1725 compositions